Gillian Chung Ka-lai (born Chung Tik-shan, 21 January 1981), known by her stage name Chung Yan-tung, is a Hong Kong actress and singer. She is a member of the Cantopop duo Twins, along with Charlene Choi.

Early life
Chung was born in Hong Kong as Chung Tik-shan. Her father died when she was one year old. When she was two years old, her family believed the character Tik (狄) from her birth name to be too strong and renamed her to Chung Ka-lai.

She initially grew up in a single parent family until her mother remarried to a man also surnamed Chung, when Chung was in high school. She was given the English name "Gillian" while in high school. Chung graduated from Kowloon True Light Middle School and briefly attended the William Angliss Institute of TAFE in Melbourne, Australia.

Career

Early years
In 2000, Chung was contacted by one of the model agencies she worked part-time with when she was in Hong Kong. She was offered a job opportunity by Emperor Entertainment Group (EEG), which she accepted in that year. She became a contracted artist and underwent training before making her debut. She was advised by her manager Mani Fok to adopt the "Chung Yan-tung" as her stage name, after consulting fortune tellers. The name was supposed to enhance her business skills. On 18 May 2001, the management company assigned her to form a singing duo, Twins, with Charlene Choi. Chung and Choi released their first album three months later.

Acting debut
Chung made her acting film début in U Man (2002). She appeared in a number of films such as Beyond Our Ken (2004), which earned her critical acclaim as well as a nomination for Best Actress in the Golden Bauhinia Awards. In Beyond Our Ken, Chung played Chan Wai-ching, a spurned girlfriend of the eponymous Ken. The film had its world premiere at the Tokyo International Film Festival and grossed HK$3,886,355 at the box office. 

In January 2006, the film 49 Days that Chung starred in had exceeded the HK$10 million (US$1.28 million) mark, earning a spot in one of Hong Kong's best box office films for that year.

Return to film industry
After withdrawing from public for more than a year following the Edison Chen photo scandal incident and later confessed to having contemplated suicide, Chung apologised for hurting those around her, especially her long-time bandmate Charlene Choi. During the hiatus, she took classes in many areas, such as kung fu (Wing Chun), gymnastics, singing, dancing and acting, which she hoped would serve her professionally. In March 2009 she discussed the scandal on an episode of Be My Guest, which garnered 679 public complaints for the show. Afterwards she returned to work as spokesperson for TOUGH Jeansmith in the Asia region with a seven-figure pay-check. She flew to Taiwan, Shanghai, and other places for promotion. In July 2009, it was disclosed that she would get a 7-figure sum for the endorsement of botox treatment clinic Dr. Pro. Chung also appeared on stage in an adaptation of Neil Simon's I Ought to Be in Pictures, produced by Emperor Concerts, part of EEG, for a budget of HK$2 million.

Silent expression art
On 13 September 2009, Chung showcased an emotional performance art video at the Harbin Ice Snow World carnival singing competition. The silent video, previously filmed in Hong Kong, was shown at the fair lasting 8 minutes and 43 seconds. The video showed Chung switching from laughing to crying. This attraction drew hundreds of visitors each day. Many audiences thought that Chung used the art expression to reveal her apologetic attitude. However the video was only meant to show how attitudes are expressed through art, according to artist and video creator Jiang Zhi.

Debut solo album
On 27 March 2010, Chung released her début solo EP, which was sold as part of the package of Twins' fourth compilation album Everyone Bounce (人人彈起). The EP includes six songs, including début solo single More Hearts (心多) that was released a year prior to the album release.

Sisters Who Make Waves
On 5 August 2022, Chung debuted at 5th place for the third season of Sisters Who Make Waves which premiered on May 20, 2022, on Mango TV. Chung decided to join the competition with her long time bandmate Charlene Choi and compete against other 28 female artistes with diverse talents. At the same time, Chung aimed to lose weight and retuning her mindset. Due to 4 months of rigorous dance rehearsals and sheer willpower, Chung succeeded in shedding 20 pounds at the end of the competition.

Personal life

2006 invasion of privacy incident
In 2006 during a concert in Genting Highlands, Malaysia, a reporter surreptitiously photographed Chung nude in the changing room. On 22 August, Hong Kong tabloid magazine Easy Finder published the photos as a cover story. Hong Kong celebrities such as Jackie Chan and Andy Lau staged a public protest denouncing the magazine. The Obscene Articles Tribunal classified the published photographs as "indecent". On 1 November, Easy Finder lost its appeal against the obscenity ruling, with the appeal panel declaring the article as a "calculated act of selling sexuality which is corrupting and revolting". Jimmy Lai, founder of Easy Finders publisher Next Media, apologized to Chung and offered to return all the negatives.

2008 photo scandal

In January and February 2008, sexually explicit photos of Edison Chen with a number of Hong Kong female celebrities were leaked online. The scandal involved Chung, as well as Bobo Chan and Cecilia Cheung, amongst others. The pictures tarnished Chung's "squeaky-clean image", and she apologized to the public for being naive and silly. Her subsequent television appearance on Jade Solid Gold triggered over 500 complaints to TVB, while the Hong Kong Broadcasting Authority received over 1200. Other promotion events were cancelled.

Chung was dropped from performing in the 2008 Summer Olympics opening ceremony by director Zhang Yimou. She was originally set to appear in Chen Kaige's film Forever Enthralled and Oliver Stone's W., but her scenes were left on the cutting room floor.

Marriage 

In July 2017, Chung met Michael Lai, a Taiwanese gynecologists', while filming Tree in the River in Taiwan and they were in a relationship in October. On 1 February 2018, Chung announced her engagement with Lai on Instagram, with a photo of a diamond ring given by her fiancé. The pair held a wedding ceremony in Los Angeles on 26 May, and one in Hong Kong on 20 December. The couple separated in March 2020.

Discography

Filmography

Film

Television

Variety Shows & Other Shows

Notes

References

External links

 Gillian Chung at EEG
 
 
 Gillian Chung at Chinesemov.com
 

1981 births
Living people
Hong Kong Buddhists
Hong Kong idols
21st-century Hong Kong actresses
21st-century Hong Kong  women singers
Hong Kong film actresses
Hong Kong television actresses